"", (English: The Great Man) also known as , or   is a salsa song written in 1986 by Omar Alfanno and sung by Willie Colón.

Release and success 
The song was written in 1986 by the Panamanian composer Omar Alfanno  and was sung by Willie Colón with his group Legal Alien. It was included in the album Top Secrets in 1989, the last album produced by Fania. The record went gold and platinum and received a Grammy nomination for Best Tropical Latin Performance. "" peaked at number 13 on the Hot Latin Songs chart in the United States. The song was at the top of musical lists in ten countries and ranks # 23 Billboards list of 50 best Latin songs of all time.

Historical value 
Years later, his father is enraged that  has not called, until finally he learns that his son died alone in a hospital, presumably of AIDS. According to Alfanno, "" is a song about a friend of his. 

"" was the first Spanish-language song to broach the subject of AIDS and HIV; however, it did not mention the disease by name, saying  died "of a strange disease." The song is a symbol for LGBT rights, as it talks about homophobia.

Versions 
There are two versions made by Willie Colón; the original is 6:54 minutes long. In this version  is born in 1956 and dies in 1986 ("Willie Colón, Super éxitos"). In the second version, the song is 6:03 minutes long,  is born in 1963 and dies in 1993 ("Willie Colón, Sólo éxitos" or "Willie Colón y Rubén Blades, Frente a frente").

The song has been covered by other groups and artists. Sonora Kaliente covered it, selling six million copies. In 2007, Danny Frank, a Colombian singer, did a version of the song. A reggae version was done by Eclipse Reggae. A rap version was made by Jako. Cumbia versions were made by Damas Gratis and La Sonora Tropicana.

In popular media 
 is also the name of a Mexican movie filmed in 2002 and inspired by the topic of the song. It was directed by Miguel Barreda Delgado and features artists Alberto Estrella, Victor Carpinteiro, and Alicia Encinas.

See also 
 Pedro Navaja

References 

1989 songs
Cross-dressing
LGBT-related songs
Songs about HIV/AIDS
Songs written by Omar Alfanno
Willie Colón songs